Grant's is a blended Scotch whisky, produced by the company William Grant & Sons in Scotland.

Is the world's third highest selling Scotch whisky.

History 

In 1886, William Grant started working in the distillery business as a bookkeeper. In 1898, Pattison's, the largest Scotch whisky blender at the time, went bankrupt, and William Grant stepped in and launched Grant's whisky. William built the Glenfiddich distillery in Dufftown, Scotland, with the help of his seven sons and two daughters. On Christmas Day 1887, it produced its first product.

Later, William's son-in-law Charles Gordon became the company's first salesman, and in 1909, he spent a year taking Grant's to Australia and the far east. In 1915, a new law stated that the minimum maturation period for Scotch whisky was to be two years (today it is three). While this led to the ruin of many a Scotch whisky distillery, William Grant had kept a supply of aging whisky in stock and was able to ensure continuous production.

William Grant died in 1923 but by this time, the family business was already established. In 1963, William's great-grandson Charles Gordon, oversaw construction of the Girvan grain distillery – now the world's second largest grain whisky producer. In 1979, Grant's UK sales surpassed 1-million cases for the first time. Today, Grant's continues to be family-owned and operated. The current CEO, Glenn Gordon, is the fifth generation of the family to lead the business.

Grant's is the oldest family-owned blended whisky and is currently sold in over 180 countries. It is the world's fourth largest Scotch whisky brand, selling 4.1 million cases of whisky in the first half of 2020. The mother company, William Grant & Sons also owns single malt whisky brands, including Glenfiddich and The Balvenie.

Bottle 

Beginning in 1957, Grant's is sold in a bottle that has a triangular cross section. The designer, Hans Schleger, came to Britain as a refugee from Nazi Germany. He was asked to create a distinctive, elegant bottle that would showcase the quality and colour of the whisky as well being able to be stacked and packed efficiently. The triangular-shaped bottle was first used in 1956 for Glenfiddich Single Malt Scotch, also owned by William Grant & Sons.

In 2002, the Grant's bottle and label were both updated. This included embossing the bottle with the Grant coat of arms and the motto "Stand Fast" – the war cry of Clan Grant, to which William belonged. The words "Est. 1887" and "Independent Family Distillers for Five Generations" were also added.

Whiskies 
Grant's blended whiskies are made using grain whisky from the Girvan distillery as the invariant base, with which a variety of single malts and other grain whiskies are blended. The full range includes the Grant's Triple Wood Blended Scotch whisky, Ale Cask, Sherry Cask, the Triple Wood 12 year old and the 18 & 25 Year Old whiskies.

 Grant's Triple Wood Blended Scotch Whisky - Grant's Family Reserve was renamed Grant's Triple Wood in 2018 and is described as having a complex, clean and fruity taste. Jim Murray praised this blend, “It defies the odds for quality” in his Whisky Bible 2010. The ABV percentage of this blend is 40%.
 Grant's Triple Wood 12 Year Old Whisky - The reworked and renamed Grant's 12 Year Old Whisky, blended in three types of oak casks; a Sherry cask, an American Oak cask and a Bourbon refill. The constituent whiskies have matured for a minimum of 12 years.
 Grant's Ale Cask Reserve - the only Scotch finished in ale casks, giving it a taste described as creamy, malty and honeyed.
 Grant's Sherry Cask Reserve - finishes its maturation in oak casks that have previously held Oloroso sherry. This imparts distinctive sherry wood notes. The key flavours are sherry, oak and smoke.
 Grant's Blended Malt - created exclusively from Speyside-style single malts to produce a blend with a malty, fruity taste. Available exclusively in Taiwan, its taste is described as sweet, smooth and delicate.
 Grant's Rare 18 Year Old Whisky - a Scotch whisky described as rich and full bodied with fruity port notes.
 Grant's 25 Year Old Whisky - a blend of 25 malt and grain whiskies, including the first ever whisky laid down at Grant's Girvan distillery. It is described as having a smooth, singular sweetness.
 Grant's Distillery Edition - a non-chill filtered blend which imparts a greater depth of flavour and intensity of taste that is described as brilliantly, intriguingly and deliciously structured.

References

External links 
Grant's International website

Alcoholic drink brands
Scottish brands
Blended Scotch whisky
William Grant & Sons